James Green (born June 22, 1983 in Langley, British Columbia) is a professional Canadian football linebacker who is currently retired. He was drafted by the Toronto Argonauts in the third round of the 2009 CFL Draft. Green was later released by the Argonauts on June 17, 2010. He was signed by the Edmonton Eskimos on July 9, 2010 but later released. He then signed with the Winnipeg Blue Bombers on August 3, 2010. He played CIS football for the Calgary Dinos. On December 16, 2013, Green was drafted by the Ottawa Redblacks in the 2013 CFL Expansion Draft. Played 2014-2016. On February 13, 2016, Green signed with the Calgary Stampeders. On June 14, 2016, Green was released.

External links
Ottawa Redblacks bio 

1983 births
Living people
Calgary Dinos football players
Canadian football linebackers
Edmonton Elks players
Sportspeople from Vernon, British Columbia
Players of Canadian football from British Columbia
Toronto Argonauts players
Ottawa Redblacks players